Steven Mark Forshaw (born 19 June 1974) is a former English  cricketer. Forshaw was a right-handed batsman who bowled right-arm medium pace.

In 1998 Forshaw also made his Minor Counties Championship debut for Dorset against Herefordshire. From 1998 to 2000 Forshaw represented Dorset in 18 Minor Counties matches, with his final match for Dorset coming against Cumberland in the final of the 2000 Minor Counties Championship, which Dorset won by 5 wickets.

In 1998 Forshaw also made his List-A debut for Dorset in the 1998 NatWest Trophy 1st round against Hampshire County Cricket Club. Forshaw played a further 4 List-A matches for Dorset from 1998 to 2002, with his final List-A match for Dorset coming against the Worcestershire Cricket Board in the 2003 Cheltenham & Gloucester Trophy which was played in 2002. In his 4 List-A matches for Dorset he took 7 wickets at a bowling average of 30.85, with best figures of 2/22.

External links
Steve Forshaw at Cricinfo
Steve Forshaw at CricketArchive

1974 births
Living people
People from South Somerset (district)
English cricketers
Dorset cricketers